Clare Joanne Connor  (born 1 September 1976) is an English former cricketer who batted right-handed and bowled slow left arm spin. She held the presidency of Marylebone Cricket Club from 2021 until 2022. She made her England One Day International debut in 1995 and played her first Test match that winter. She achieved a hat-trick against India in 1999 and captained England from 2000 until her retirement from international cricket in 2006.

She is currently managing director of Women's Cricket for the England and Wales Cricket Board (ECB).

Early life and career
Connor was born on 1 September 1976 in Brighton, East Sussex, England. She studied English at the University of Manchester, and graduated with a Bachelor of Arts (BA) degree in 1998. During her time at Manchester, Clare was a resident at Hulme Hall.

Connor taught English, P.S.H.E and PE at Brighton College while heading up their PR operations, and also spent time working for Channel 4.

Cricket career
Connor first came to prominence by captaining the U16 at Preston Nomads, a leading club side in Sussex. The youth manager, Malcolm Reid, was responsible for this appointment and the move was supported by the club. She also played for the Brighton College (men's) team a little before her England career began. She has also appeared in The Cricketer Cup (in 2002), the first woman ever to do so. In 2004/05 she captained the England side to the semi-finals of the 2005 Women's World Cup in South Africa, and that winter also played state cricket for Central Districts Women in New Zealand.

In 2006, she became the first woman to play for the all-star charity side, Lashings World XI.

Honours
In the 2004 Queen's Birthday Honours, Connor was appointed a Member of the Order of the British Empire (MBE) "for services to Women's Cricket". In the 2006 New Year Honours, she was promoted to Officer of the Order of the British Empire (OBE) "for services to Cricket"; at the same time, the men's winning Ashes Team also received honours. As the current director of English women's cricket, following the team's success in winning the 2017 World Cup she was promoted to Commander of the Order of the British Empire (CBE) in the 2018 New Year Honours, again for services to cricket.

On 24 June 2020, Connor was announced as the next President of the Marylebone Cricket Club. She assumed the office on 1 October 2021, replacing Kumar Sangakkara, whose term was extended for a year due to the COVID-19 pandemic. She also became the first woman to be appointed as the President of MCC in the 233 years of MCC club's history.

References

External links
 

1976 births
Living people
Sportspeople from Brighton
People educated at Brighton College
Alumni of the University of Manchester
Central Districts Hinds cricketers
Commanders of the Order of the British Empire
England women One Day International cricketers
England women Test cricketers
England women Twenty20 International cricketers
Sussex women cricketers
Women's One Day International cricket hat-trick takers
Presidents of the Marylebone Cricket Club